In Inuit mythology, Aumanil (pronounced au-MAHN-EL) is a kind and beneficent spirit.  Also, it is said that this god lived on land and controlled the movement of the whales.

Inuit legendary creatures